The Angachak Range (also "Большой Ангачак" —"Big Angachak") is a mountain range in the Magadan Oblast, Far Eastern Federal District, Russia. The nearest city is Susuman, and the nearest airport Susuman Airport.

Geography
The Angachak Range rises at the northern end of the Upper Kolyma Highlands, in the southernmost sector of the Chersky Range System. The range is bound by the Kolyma River valley from the south and in the north it connects with the main ridge of the Chersky Range.

There are numerous rivers, waterfalls and lakes in the area. In the western part lies Lake Jack London, just beneath Pik Aborigen.

Flora and climate

The higher elevations have only mountain tundra. 

The zone of the Angachak Range has a harsh continental subarctic climate. In summer the average July temperature does not exceed . There are often avalanches in the mountains, and snowstorms are also frequent.

References

External links
Far Eastern Entomologist No 153: 1-39 ISSN 1026-051X - October 2005
Путешествие на хребет Большой Ангачак (озеро Джека Лондона). 14 дней в тайге! 100 км! часть ВТОРАЯ!
Kolyma - Tourism
Mountain ranges of Magadan Oblast
Chersky Range
Tourist attractions in Magadan Oblast